North Thetford is an unincorporated village in the town of Thetford, Orange County, Vermont, United States. North Thetford has a post office with ZIP code 05054.

References

Unincorporated communities in Orange County, Vermont
Unincorporated communities in Vermont